Richard Baron may refer to:

Richard Baron (botanist) (1847–1907), English missionary and botanist working in Madagascar
Richard Baron (dissenting minister) (c. 1700–1768), English dissenting minister and Whig pamphleteer
Richard Baron (philosopher) (born 1958), British philosopher
Richard Baron, real estate developer and co-founder of McCormack Baron Salazar
Richard Baron (physician) (born 1953), president and CEO of American Board of Internal Medicine and ABIM Foundation
Richard S. Baron (1901–1942), United States Navy officer

See also

Richard Barron, Canadian-born translator
Richard Barron (basketball), basketball coach 
Richard Barrons (born 1959), British Army officer